Hispanic and Latino Coloradans are residents of the state of Colorado who are of Hispanic or Latino ancestry. As of 2020, Hispanics and Latinos of any race made up 21% of the state's population, or 1,269,520 of the state's total 5,770,545 residents.

History 
1694- The New Mexico governor Diego de Vargas traveled to present-day Colorado, following the Rio Grande to a tributary, Culebra Creek. He recorded several  toponyms, including  Colorado River. 

1706- Juan de Ulibarri claimed the west of present-day Colorado for Spain. Western Colorado was incorporated into Santa Fe de Nuevo México. In 1762- After the Seven Years' War, France ceded western Louisiana to Spain, including eastern Colorado.

1776- The Domínguez-Escalante expedition took place in northern New Spain. Led by friars Silvestre Velez de Escalante and Francisco Atanacio Dominguez, the expedition team sought a route linking Santa Fe to Monterey. They travelled through northern New Mexico, Colorado and Utah.

1787- Juan Bautista de Anza established the settlement of San Carlos near present-day Pueblo, Colorado but it quickly failed. Spain returned 

1800- Spain returns Louisiana to France in 1800, including eastern Colorado. France later cedes Louisiana to the US in 1803. 

1833- A group of 80 families from Abiquiu, Taos migrated to modern-day Colorado. They settled in Conejos County, but the Navajos attacked them and the settlers lost their goods, so they returned to their  homeland.

1840's- The Utes prevent the settlement of Nuevomexicanos. 

1848- Northwest Mexico was incorporated into the US, including western Colorado.

1851- A small group of Nuevomexicanos from Taos migrated to the San Luis Valley. They founded the first Hispanic permanent settlement and initiated Hispanic migration to Colorado. This first group was followed by another 50 Nuevomexicano families from Abiquiu and El Llanito, which settled in Guadalupe three years later. 

1860's- Hispanic pastoralists migrate to Colorado from Latin America when the country demanded wool uniforms for its soldiers during the American Civil War, while many other Nuevomexicanos migrated to counties such as Las Animas or Huerfano.

1870's-  Over 5,000 people of that origin lived in these counties, making up more than 90% of the population in both regions. From then on, many other Hispanics migrated to Colorado. 

1880's- Mexican migration even gave rise to a Hispanic neighborhood in the modern-day "America The Beautiful Park" in Colorado Springs, which included a school, a church and several businesses. This was abandoned in the early 20th century. 

1950's- Hispanics are distributed in various regions of Colorado (San Acacio,  Saguache, Guadalupe, etc.).  

1990 to Present - The Hispanic population grows significantly, consisting of mostly Mexicans, seeking better social conditions.

Demographics 
According to Latino Leadearship Institute webside Hispanics number more than 100,000 people in Adams, Arapahoe, Denver and El Paso. They represented over 33% in Adams, Alamosa, Conejos, Costilla, Huerfano, Las Animas, Morgan, Otero, Prowers, Pueblo, Rio Grande and Saguache counties. Most of Hispanics and Latinos of Colorado live in Western Colorado. The majority of Hispanics in the state are under the age of 18 (35% of Hispanics), while the rest of the Hispanic population is mainly made up of the 18-34 and 35-54 age groups (28% and 25% respectively).

Cities and town where the Hispanics are mayority (2010 census)

Places with between 10,000 and 25,000 people
Berkley (55.7%)
Sherrelwood (58.9%)
Welby (54.7%)

Places with fewer than 10,000 people 
Alamosa (53.2%)
Alamosa East (54.1%)
Antonito (85.1%)
Avondale (59.8%)
Blanca (60.8%)
Cattle Creek (65.4%)
Capulin (83.0%)
Center (87.4%)
Conejos (82.8%)
Crowley (54.0%)
Del Norte (56.3%)
Derby (64.2%)
Dotsero (81.4%)
Fort Garland (85.0%)
Fort Lupton (55.0%)
Garden City (66.2%)
Gilcrest (55.5%)
Granada (70.6%)
Jansen (58.0%)
La Jara (62.3%)
Log Lane Village (50.1%)
Lynn (66.7%)
Monte Vista (61.3%)
Olathe (50.0%)
Rocky Ford (59.1%)
Romeo (79.5%)
Salt Creek (86.0%)
San Acacio (62.5%)
San Luis (84.3%)
Starkville (72.9%)
Trinidad (50.0%)
Twin Lakes (Adams County) (60.7%)
Walsenburg (56.0%)
Weston (72.7%)
Valdez, Colorado (61.7%)

Historic Hispanic/Latino population

Notable residents
 Jose Ramon Aguilar (1852-1929) Pioneer rancher. Aguilar, CO is named for him.
Antonio D. Archuleta State Senator. In 1883 introduced the bill to create Archuleta County from the western portion of Conejos County.
 Felipe Baca (1828–1874) Pioneer rancher. Helped found Trinidad, CO. Baca County is named for him.
 Polly Baca (born 1941) first Hispanic woman elected to the Colorado State Senate.
 Casimiro Barela (1847–1920) Helped write Colorado's State Constitution.
 Rodolfo "Corky" Gonzales (1928-2005) Community Activist.
Miguel Antonio Otero (1829-1882) Pioneer merchant. Otero County is named for him.
 Federico Peña (born March 15, 1947) First Hispanic Mayor of Denver, CO.

See also

Hispanic and Latino Americans
Hispanos
Neomexicano

References

External links
Latinos & Hispanics in Colorado Collection Auraria Library, Denver, Colorado.
Hispanic and Latino Collections Denver Public Library, Denver, Colorado.